A detachment left in contact (DLIC) is a portion of a military force left in contact position with the enemy as part of a maneuver. The rest of the force then maneuvers to another attacking position. The detachment left in contact maintains the appearance of a full unit in contact until ordered otherwise. It is normally part of a withdrawal not under pressure. The DLIC disengages and withdraws after the main body has begun movement to the next mission.

Related
 Covering force
 Screening (tactical)
 Withdrawal (military)

External links
 https://fas.org/man/dod-101/army/docs/fm101-5-1/f545-d.htm
 https://www.benning.army.mil/Infantry/DoctrineSupplement/ATP3-21.8/chapter_05/section_02/page_0020/index.html

Maneuver tactics